Moncenisio is the smallest comune (municipality) in the Metropolitan City of Turin in the Italian region of Piedmont, located about 60 km west of Turin, on the border with France, in Val Cenischia.

Moncenisio borders the following municipalities: Val-Cenis (France), Novalesa, and Venaus.

References

External links
 Official website

Cities and towns in Piedmont